{{DISPLAYTITLE:C3H3NO3}}
The molecular formula C3H3NO3 (molar mass: 101.061 g/mol) may refer to:

 2,4-Oxazolidinedione
 Glycine N-carboxyanhydride (2,5-Oxazolidinedione)

Molecular formulas